Stanley Meadows (born 14 July 1931 in Stepney, London, England) is a British film and television actor. He graduated from RADA in 1955. Meadows made frequent appearances in British films and became something of a stalwart of British television series including Public Eye, Undermind, Randall and Hopkirk and Widows (Eddie Rawlins).

Filmography

References

External links

1931 births
Living people
British male film actors
British male television actors
Alumni of RADA